Douglas Chandler (May 26, 1889  – after 1970s) was an American broadcaster of Nazi propaganda during World War II. He was convicted of treason and sentenced to life imprisonment in 1947 but was released in 1963.

Early life
Born in Chicago, Illinois, Chandler was an officer in the United States Navy during the First World War and later wrote a weekly news column for a newspaper in Baltimore.

He was financially ruined in the Wall Street Crash of 1929 and "fed up to the chin with the Depression and the miasma that was enveloping Washington." He moved from the United States to France and then to Germany in 1931. There he worked as a journalist who showed Nazi Germany in an ideal light and contributed on that theme to the National Geographic Magazine.

Propaganda for Nazi Germany
In April 1941, Chandler began to broadcast Nazi propaganda from Berlin for the Reichs-Rundfunk-Gesellschaft, German state radio, working as a commentator in its U.S.A. Zone. When Germany declared war on the United States on December 11, 1941, American citizens were repatriated by the U.S. government, but Chandler chose to stay.

Chandler broadcast to the United States under the pseudonym "Paul Revere." His programs began with the sound of clattering hooves and the song "Yankee Doodle" and were mainly anti-Roosevelt and anti-Semitic in content. He appealed to Americans to "throw off tyranny" and to their isolationist sentiment. He also asserted that Washington was under the control of Jewish advisers.

Chandler became known as America's Lord Haw-Haw because of his cultivated American voice. Though he had become a convinced Nazi, his activities were not motivated by idealism alone. He was paid $3,200 a month as a broadcaster, which put him in the top six on the Reichs-Rundfunk-Gesellschaft’s payroll.

Towards the end of 1943, the increased Allied bombing of Berlin caused Chandler to be relocated first to Vienna and then to Munich, where he made his last broadcasts sometime in February 1945.

Arrest
Chandler was taken into custody by the U.S. Army at his home in Durach, Bavaria, in May 1945, but he was released on October 23, 1945. He was then rearrested by the U.S. Army on or about March 12, 1946 at the request of the Department of Justice.

He was then flown to the United States to stand trial and arrived on December 14, 1946.

Trial

On July 26, 1943, Chandler, along with Fred W. Kaltenbach, Jane Anderson, Edward Delaney, Constance Drexel, Robert Henry Best, Max Otto Koischwitz, and Ezra Pound, had been indicted in absentia by a District of Columbia grand jury on charges of treason.

Chandler stood trial at the Boston Federal District Court on June 6, 1947. He entered a defense of insanity because of paranoia and did not testify at his trial. The prosecution relied mainly on the evidence provided by recordings of Chandler's wartime broadcasts from Germany recorded by the Federal Communications Commission station at Silver Hill, Maryland, to show his active participation in propaganda activities against the United States.

Chandler was found guilty of all ten counts of treason on June 28, 1947. He was fined $10,000 and sentenced to life imprisonment by Federal Judge Francis Ford. On being convicted for treason, Chandler also automatically lost his U.S. citizenship. According to a contemporary newspaper, "Death by hanging had been demanded by Special Government Prosecutor Oscar R. Ewing who characterized the tall and gray-haired defendant as a black-hearted traitor who 'gave his heart and soul to Hitler' because he wanted Germany to win the war." Chandler's subsequent appeal was denied.

Release
In 1963, Chandler's sentence was commuted by then U.S. President John F. Kennedy on the condition of immediately leaving the United States. Chandler was released from the federal penitentiary at Lewisburg, Pennsylvania on August 9, 1963 and immediately returned to Germany. In 1970, Chandler wrote a letter to National Geographic editor Melville Bell Grosvenor, requesting reimbursement for expenses that incurred on an assignment that had been canceled shortly after his Nazi sympathies were revealed. Later unverified witness reports placed him on the Canary Islands in the 1970s, however this cannot be confirmed.

See also
Jane Anderson (Nazi collaborator)
Robert Henry Best
Herbert John Burgman
Donald S. Day
Edward Leo Delaney
Mildred Gillars
Ezra Pound
United States Penitentiary, Lewisburg

References

External links
Courtroom Battle of World War II (Part 1 of 3). Contains information on the careers and fates of some of the Nazi broadcasters and other collaborators.
Courtroom Battles of World War II (Part 2 of 3).
Courtroom Battles of World War II (Part 3 of 3).

1889 births
Year of death missing
Military personnel from Chicago
American anti-communists
American fascists
United States Navy personnel of World War I
American collaborators with Nazi Germany
American prisoners sentenced to life imprisonment
American radio journalists
American radio reporters and correspondents
American male journalists
American expatriates in Germany
Antisemitism in Germany
Radio personalities from Chicago
United States Navy officers
Nazi propagandists
Loss of United States citizenship by prior Nazi affiliation
People convicted of treason against the United States
Prisoners sentenced to life imprisonment by the United States federal government
Prisoners and detainees of the United States military
Recipients of American presidential clemency